Alain-François Lehoerff (21 May 1941 – 26 December 2003) was a French sailor. He competed in the Flying Dutchman event at the 1964 Summer Olympics.

References

External links
 
 

1941 births
2003 deaths
French male sailors (sport)
Olympic sailors of France
Sailors at the 1964 Summer Olympics – Flying Dutchman
Sportspeople from Ille-et-Vilaine